Big Dismal is a Florida-based Christian rock band featuring vocalist Eric Durrance, guitarist Chuck Shea, bassist Gary Sobel, and drummer Corey Lane. Believe, the official debut, appeared in May 2003. 

Rolling Stone named Big Dismal one of "Five Christian Bands on the Rise" and the band had three consecutive No. 1 singles off their debut record, Believe on Christian Rock radio ("Remember (I.O.U.)", "Reality" and "Just the Same"). "Remember (I.O.U.)" was named Song of the Year in Christian Rock Radio by Radio and Records, having remained at No. 1 on the chart for six weeks. The song was also used in the Chris Benoit tribute edition of Raw. Big Dismal was named Band of the Year in the Christian Rock market by Radio and Records and were also nominated for a Dove award in 2004 for Christian Rock Album of the Year. Music videos were created for four songs including "Rainy Day."

The "Believe" album for Wind-Up received critical acclaim but failed to sell well. Front man Eric Durrance announced that the band split, and he joined Tobacco Rd Band.  In February 2015, Big Dismal announced that they had reformed and a new EP would be available later in the year.

Discography
Believe  -  Released: May 20, 2003, Wind-Up

Other
The Passion of the Christ: Songs "Rainy Day" and "Reason I Live"

External links
 http://www.ericdurrance.com

Christian rock groups from Florida